The 2002 Big West Conference men's basketball tournament was held March 7–9 at Anaheim Convention Center in Anaheim, California.

 defeated  in the championship game, 60–56, to obtain the first Big West Conference men's basketball tournament championship in school history.

The Gauchos participated in the 2002 NCAA Division I men's basketball tournament after earning the conference's automatic bid.

Format

Teams were seeded based on regular season conference records.

Bracket

References

Big West Conference men's basketball tournament
Tournament
Big West Conference men's basketball tournament
Big West Conference men's basketball tournament